Boxing at the 2018 Commonwealth Games was held at the Oxenford Studios in the Gold Coast, Australia from April 5th to 14th. 

A total of 16 events are scheduled to be held, 10 for men and six for women. Additional women's events were added by the Commonwealth Games Federation (CGF) to get to a gender equal number of events overall for men and women.

Medal table
Key
 Host nation (Australia)

Medallists

Men

Women

Participating nations
There are 48 participating nations in boxing with a total of 217 athletes.

References

External links
 Results Book – Boxing

 
2018
2018 Commonwealth Games events
Boxing competitions in Australia
2018 in boxing